Khardan may refer to the following villages in Iran:
 Khardan, Chaharmahal and Bakhtiari
 Khardan, Baft, in Baft County of Kerman Province
 Khardan, Jiroft, in Jiroft County of Kerman Province
 Khardan-e Do, in Bardsir County of Kerman Province

See also
Hardan (disambiguation)